The 1968 Davis Cup was the 57th edition of the Davis Cup, the most important tournament between national teams in men's tennis. 32 teams entered the Europe Zone, 9 teams entered the Americas Zone, and 8 teams entered the Eastern Zone. Peru made its first appearance in the tournament, having previously entered on 3 separate occasions before subsequently withdrawing before competing in a tie.

The United States defeated Ecuador in the Americas Inter-Zonal final, India defeated Japan in the Eastern Inter-Zonal final, and Spain and West Germany were the winners of the two Europe Zones, defeating Italy and South Africa respectively.

In the Inter-Zonal Zone, the United States defeated Spain and India defeated West Germany in the semifinals, and then the United States defeated India in the final. The United States then defeated the defending champions Australia in the Challenge Round, ending Australia's four-year title run. The final was played at Memorial Drive Park in Adelaide, Australia on 26–28 December.

Incidents
In what became known as the Båstad riots, the Europe Zone first-round tie between Sweden and Rhodesia, planned to be held in Båstad, Sweden, caused widespread disruption as demonstrators protested the participation of both Rhodesia and South Africa in the tournament. Both countries had been banned from competing in other sports competitions due to their apartheid and white minority rule policies.

Following discussions between the Swedish government and demonstrators, the International Tennis Federation and Swedish Tennis Federation decided to move the tie to a neutral location in Bandol, France.

Americas Zone

North & Central America Zone

South America Zone

Americas Inter-Zonal Final
United States vs. Ecuador

Eastern Zone

Zone A

Zone B

Eastern Inter-Zonal Final
Japan vs. India

Europe Zone

Zone A

Zone A Final
Spain vs. Italy

Zone B

Zone B Final
West Germany vs. South Africa

Inter-Zonal Zone

Draw

Semifinals
West Germany vs. India

United States vs. Spain

Final
United States vs. India

Challenge Round
Australia vs. United States

See also
 The White Game, a 1968 Swedish documentary film about the protests around the match between Sweden and Rhodesia.

References

External links
Davis Cup Official Website

 
Davis Cups by year
Davis Cup
Davis Cup
Davis Cup
Davis Cup
Davis Cup
Davis Cup
Davis Cup
1968 in German tennis